The 2005 MuchMusic Video Awards were held on June 19, 2005 and featured performances by k-os, Alexisonfire, Billy Talent, Arcade Fire, Ciara and others. The most nominated artist was Billy Talent with 9 nominations.

Best Video
 Billy Talent — "River Below"
 Billy Talent — "Nothing to Lose"
 k-os — "Crabbuckit"
 k-os — "Man I Used to Be"
 Simple Plan — "Untitled (How Could This Happen to Me)"

Best Director
 k.os — "Man I Used to Be" (directed by: The Love Movement f. Micah J. Meisner & k.os)
 Billy Talent — "Nothing to Lose"
 Billy Talent — "River Below"
 k.os — "Crabbuckit"
 Shawn Desman - "Let's Go"

Best Post-Production
 Death From Above 1979 — "Romantic Rights"
 Billy Talent — "River Below"
 Jakalope — "Feel It"
 Pilate — "Overrated"
 The Tea Party — "Writing's On The Wall"

Best Cinematography
 k.os — "Man I Used to Be"
 Billy Talent — "Nothing to Lose"
 Jakalope — "Feel It"
 Kalan Porter — "Single"
 Pilate — "Overrated"

Best Pop Video
 k.os — "Crabbuckit"
 Kalan Porter — "Single"
 Keshia Chanté — "Does He Love Me"
 Shawn Desman — "Let's Go"
 Simple Plan — "Untitled (How Could This Happen to Me)"

MuchLOUD Best Rock Video
 Billy Talent — "River Below"
 Alexisonfire — "Accidents"
 Billy Talent — "Nothing to Lose"
 Death From Above 1979 — "Romantic Rights"
 Jakalope — "Feel It"

MuchVibe Best Rap Video
 k.os — "Man I Used to Be"
 Choclair f. Saukrates, Ro Dolla & Solitair — "Tell 'Em"
 Masia One — "Split Second Time"
 Massari f. Loon — "Smile for Me"
 Rochester aka Juice f. Kolor Brown — "A New Day"

Best Independent Video
 Alexisonfire — "Accidents"
 Death From Above 1979 — "Romantic Rights"
 Jakalope — "Feel It"
 Massari f. Loon — "Smile for Me"
 Arcade Fire — "Rebellion (Lies)"

MuchMoreMusic Award
 Shania Twain — "Party for Two"
 Celine Dion — "You and I"
 Feist — "Inside and Out"
 Michael Bublé — "Home"
 Sarah McLachlan — "World On Fire"

Best French Video
 Ariane Moffatt — "Fracture du crâne"
 Corneille — "Seul au monde"
 Les Trois Accords — "Saskatchewan"
 Loco Locass — "Groove Grave"
 Marie-Mai — "Il faut que tu t'en ailles"

Best International Video – Artist
 Usher — "Caught Up"
 50 Cent f. Olivia — "Candy Shop"
 Ciara f. Missy Elliott — "1, 2 Step"
 Eminem — "Just Lose It"
 Eric Prydz — "Call on Me"
 Gwen Stefani — "What You Waiting For?"
 Kanye West — "Jesus Walks"
 Nas f. Olu Dara — "Bridging the Gap"
 Snoop Dogg f. Pharrell — "Drop It Like It's Hot"
 The Game f. 50 Cent — "Hate It or Love It"

Best International Video - Group
 The Killers — "Mr. Brightside"
 The Black Eyed Peas — "Let's Get It Started"
 Destiny's Child — "Lose My Breath"
 Green Day — "American Idiot"
 Green Day — "Boulevard of Broken Dreams"
 Jet — "Look What You've Done"
 My Chemical Romance — "Helena"
 The Bravery — "An Honest Mistake"
 The Used — "All That I've Got"
 U2 — "Vertigo"

People's Choice: Favourite International Group
 Green Day — "Boulevard of Broken Dreams"
 Black Eyed Peas — "Let's Get It Started"
 Maroon 5 — "She Will Be Loved"
 The Killers — "Mr. Brightside"
 U2 — "Vertigo"

People's Choice: Favourite International Artist
 Gwen Stefani f. Eve — "Rich Girl"
 50 Cent f. Olivia — "Candy Shop"
 Eminem — "Just Lose It"
 The Game — "How We Do"
 Usher — "Caught Up"

People's Choice: Favourite Canadian Group
 Simple Plan — "Welcome to My Life"''
 Alexisonfire — "Accidents"
 Billy Talent — "River Below"
 Sum 41 — "Pieces"
 Theory of a Deadman — "No Surprise"

People's Choice: Favourite Canadian Artist
Kalan Porter — "Single"
 Avril Lavigne — "My Happy Ending"
 Keshia Chanté — "Does He Love Me"
 k.os — "Crabbuckit"
 Shawn Desman — "Let's Go"

Performers
The Killers
Ashlee Simpson
k-os
Alexisonfire
Black Eyed Peas
Arcade Fire
Ciara
Billy Talent

References

External links
 

MuchMusic Video Awards
MuchMusic
Muchmusic Video Awards, 2005
2005 in Canadian music